In early April 2022, communal violence erupted in four Indian states Gujarat, Madhya Pradesh, Jharkhand and West Bengal - during processions on 10 April 2022, on the occasion of the Hindu festival of Ram Naomi, the birth anniversary of Hindu God Rama. Dozens of people were injured, including police officers. At least one person was killed in Gujarat. Dozens of houses, shops and vehicles were set on fire during the clashes, causing loss of crores of rupees. Later on 17 April 2022, Indian police arrest 14 in New Delhi in connection with communal violence.

Overview

Gujarat 
Various incidents of clashes took place in Khambat and Himmatnagar cities of Gujarat State. The clash in Himmatnagar started when the procession entered the Muslim-majority area where verbal altercations were followed by sloganeering after which, the Muslims started stone-pelting on the bike rallies. There are also reports of 2 deaths and hundreds of people injured.

JNU 
A dispute between the student union JNSU and the BJP's student body ABVP over non-veg or meat meal on Ram Naomi day at Jawaharlal Nehru University in New Delhi, turned violent. ۔ At least 16 students were injured in the beating by both sides. The ABVP said that offering non-veg food on the auspicious occasion of Ram Naomi was tantamount to insulting Hindu God Rama. Delhi Police has registered a case in this regard. The injured have been admitted to hospitals for treatment.

Madhya Pradesh 

Clashes broke out in Khargone and other towns in the state of Madhya Pradesh. According to reports, accused in the Delhi riots, BJP leader Kapil Mishra was also involved in Ram Naomi's procession in Khargone. Former Madhya Pradesh Chief Minister Digvijaya Singh wrote in a tweet, "Wherever Mishra steps, riots break out."
.

Delhi 

On 16 April 2022, communal clashes broke out between Hindu worshipers and Muslim locals when a Hanuman Jayanti procession was passing through the area of Jahangirpuri in North west Delhi. Many people including Delhi policemen were injured. |title=Jahangirpuri: Shock and anger in Delhi after religious violence |language=en-GB |work=BBC News |url=https://www.bbc.com/news/world-asia-india-61137974 |access-date=2022-04-19}}</ref> Delhi Police mentioned that the procession which led to this clash did not have a prior permission.

Jharkhand 
In Jharkhand's Lohardaga district, at least 12 people were injured in a clash during a Ram Naomi procession, three of them in critical condition.

West Bengal 
Clashes erupted during the Ram Navmi procession in the Shabpur area of Hoda in West Bengal. Police say steps have been taken to maintain law and order and the situation is under control. The opposition BJP in the state has accused the police of attacking the protesters.

References

April 2022 events in India
Riots
Religiously motivated violence in India